Rustleria is a genus of beetles in the family Teredidae. There is one described species in Rustleria, R. obscura.

References

Coccinelloidea genera
Articles created by Qbugbot